Romuald Ernault (born 20 April 1977) is a French weightlifter. He competed in the men's lightweight event at the 2004 Summer Olympics.

References

1977 births
Living people
French male weightlifters
Olympic weightlifters of France
Weightlifters at the 2004 Summer Olympics
Sportspeople from Caen
21st-century French people